Vincent Grifo (born 14 August 1943) is a Canadian judoka who represented Canada in the 1969 World Judo Championships in the -80 kg category. He also coached the Canadian Olympic judo team in 1984, was an Olympic referee in 1980, 1988, and 1992, was President of Judo Canada from 2008-2012, and was added to the Judo Canada Hall of Fame in 2005. He is currently the technical director at the Club de judo Métropolitain in Montreal, Quebec, which he founded in 1968.

See also
Judo in Quebec
Judo in Canada
List of Canadian judoka

References

Canadian male judoka
1943 births
Living people